Rhipsalis elliptica is a species of plant in the family Cactaceae. It is endemic to Brazil.  Its natural habitat is subtropical or tropical moist lowland forest. It is threatened by habitat loss.

References

elliptica
Endemic flora of Brazil
Flora of the Atlantic Forest
Near threatened flora of South America
Taxonomy articles created by Polbot